Aleksei Vladimirovich Mikhaylov (born 20 February 1983 in Moscow) is a former Russian football player.

External links
 

1983 births
Footballers from Moscow
Living people
Russian footballers
FC Dynamo Moscow players
Russian Premier League players
FC Dynamo Saint Petersburg players
FC Khimki players
Association football midfielders